Wojnowski (feminine: Wojnowska; plural: Wojnowscy) is a Polish surname. It may refer to:

 Bob Wojnowski, American reporter and columnist
 Jan Wojnowski (1946-1990), Polish weightlifter
 John Wojnowski (born 1943), American anti-pedophile activist

Polish-language surnames